Bridge Creek Falls is a  waterfall on Bridge Creek, in the Cascade Range west of Bend in the U.S. state of Oregon. Additional waterfalls are downstream along nearby Tumalo Creek, of which Bridge Creek is a tributary, including Tumalo Falls. All of these falls are within the Deschutes National Forest and is within the municipal watershed for the city of Bend.

Using the site requires a Northwest Forest Pass or payment of a fee. 

The Tumalo Falls Trail leads from the picnic area to Tumalo Falls, upstream of which continues a trail to Bridge Creek Falls.

See also
 Tumalo State Park
 List of waterfalls in Oregon

References

Waterfalls of Deschutes County, Oregon
Waterfalls of Oregon
Deschutes National Forest